Guerrico may refer to

ARA Guerrico, an Argentine Navy corvette
Rear Admiral Martín Guerrico, an Argentine Navy officer who fought in the 19th century Paraguayan War
Carlos Guerrico, an Argentine Olympic fencer.
Inés de Guerrico Eguses (Sor María Jacinta; 1793-1840), Argentine nun, writer